The Volkswagen Jetta TDI Cup was a single-make racing series sanctioned by the Sports Car Club of America.  The series was started in 2008 and was a sports car series that ran only in North America, the series quietly folded in 2011.

Rules & prizes
The series was open to only drivers between the ages of 16 and 26 who held a passport from the United States, Canada, or Mexico. The entry fee for drivers is $45,000. In addition to more than $50,000 in prize money at stake during the season, the series champion received Volkswagen factory career advancement support with a value up to $100,000.

Vehicles
The cars were 2009 Volkswagen Jettas that were modified by the factory for the series. Once completed, the cars were still about 70% stock with the other 30% made up of parts from the VW parts bin, one-off brackets and mounts, and race prepping from outside parties. The cars feature VW's DSG twin shaft, dual clutch automatic transmission and have height adjustable Sachs race suspension. Brakes were controlled by an ATE Racing ABS system and utilize Brembo 4 piston fixed calipers in front and Lucas 1 piston floating caliper disc brakes in the rear. The tires are racing slicks provided by Pirelli. The safety equipment on each car included but was not limited to airbags, seat belts,  roll cage, fire extinguishers, and an FIA rated racing seat.

Engine
 Configuration  inline 4-cylinder  TDI
 Head  4 valves per cylinder, DOHC, compression ratio 18:1
 Fuel system  Common-Rail Injection with 8 nozzle output, piezo elements, pressure up to 1850 bar
 Aspiration  turbocharged, intercooled, water-cooled exhaust gas recirculation
 Engine management Bosch
 exhaust  VW Catalyst and particulate filter
 Output  @ 4200 rpm, 368 ft-lbs @ 1900 to 2500 rpm
 Data Acquisition memotec Messtechnik

Points system
The point system used was similar to other race series in that the most points are awarded to the first place finisher and points are reduced for subsequent finishing places. The Volkswagen Jetta TDI Cup is unique in that the points are halved for the first two races compared to the points for the rest of the season.

Champions

2008 season results

† Shane Williams was a guest driver from the ADAC Polo Cup race series in Germany.
‡ David Jurca was awarded the points for a first place finish since Shane Williams did not accrue points in USA race.
For points purposes 2nd, 3rd, and 4th place finishers were awarded the points for 1st, 2nd, and 3rd respectively.
†† Liam Kenney was penalized 20 points for passing the leader, Josh Hurley under double yellow.

References

External links
 Official Website (redirects to main VW website)

 
Recurring sporting events established in 2008
Recurring events disestablished in 2011
Defunct auto racing series